was one of the most powerful and important families in Western Japan during the reign of the Ashikaga shogunate in the 12th to 14th centuries. Their domains, ruled from the castle town of Yamaguchi, comprised six provinces at their height, and the Ōuchi played a major role in supporting the Ashikaga in the Nanboku-cho Wars against the Imperial Court. The Ōuchi remained powerful up until the 1560s, when they were eclipsed by their vassals, the Mōri clan.

History 
Local legend in modern Yamaguchi City has it that the Ōuchi clan were of Korean origins, specifically descended from a prince of Baekje. The Ōuchi-shi Jitsruroku (大内氏実録), a work of the historian Kondō Kiyoshi (近藤清石, 1833–1916), is one of the books which adopt this legend. However, some scholars are in dispute, and even traditions are contradictory to each other. Modern day members of the Ouchi clan think that there is no dispute, and they strongly identify with Baekje. According to the Ō uchi Tatarashi fuch ō and the Ōuchi-shi Jitsruroku, Prince Imseong is their first ancestor.

Based in Suō Province, towards the western end of Honshū, the Ōuchi were among the primary families to be involved in foreign trade and relations, particularly with China. Following the Ōnin War (1467–1477), a strong rivalry developed between the Ōuchi and the Hosokawa family, who were then in power. The two clashed at Ningbo in 1523, and as a result the Chinese closed Ningbo to Japanese traders. After the incident, the Ōuchi ships were only allowed to trade in China in 1540 and 1549. The Ōuchi also housed the Portuguese Jesuit missionary Francis Xavier for a time in 1551.

As a result of their wealth and trading contacts, the Ōuchi gained renown in the worlds of art and culture as well. They possessed countless items of cultural and artistic significance and beauty, from Japan and China, as well as from further abroad. Particularly famous was the invitation by Ōuchi Masahiro of the famous painter Sesshū to Yamaguchi in 1486.

In 1551,  the daimyō Ōuchi Yoshitaka tried to move Emperor Go-Nara and his court from war-torn Kyoto to Yamaguchi. But the Ōuchi's chief military vassals opposed this plan, fearing that imperial courtiers would displace them. This led to the Tainei-ji incident, in which Yoshitaka was forced to commit suicide. Sue Harukata, the leader of the rebellion, installed Ōuchi Yoshinaga as a puppet clan chief, but Yoshinaga was actually the younger brother of long-time Ōuchi rival Ōtomo Sōrin. This ended the Ōuchi line proper.

In 1555, Mōri Motonari, another former vassal of Yoshitaka, defeated Sue Harukata in the Battle of Miyajima. Two years later, Yoshinaga committed suicide, ending the Ōuchi clan.

Clan heads
 Ōuchi Morifusa (大内盛房)
 Ōuchi Hiromori (大内弘盛)
 Ōuchi Mitsumori (大内満盛)
 Ōuchi Hironari (大内弘成, ? –1244)
 Ōuchi Hirosada (大内弘貞, ? –1286)
 Ōuchi Hiroie (大内弘家, 1274?–1300)
 Ōuchi Shigehiro (大内重弘, ? –1320)
 Ōuchi Hiroyuki (大内弘幸, ? –1352)
 Ōuchi Hiroyo (大内弘世, 1325–1380)
 Ōuchi Yoshihiro (大内義弘, 1356–1400) – Led a revolt against Shogun Ashikaga Yoshimitsu.
 Ōuchi Moriharu (大内盛見, 1377–1431)
 Ōuchi Mochiyo (大内持世, 1394–1441)
 Ōuchi Norihiro (大内教弘, 1420–1465)
 Ōuchi Masahiro (大内政弘, 1446–1495) – one of Yamana Sōzen's chief generals in the Ōnin War.
 Ōuchi Yoshioki (大内義興, 1477–1529) – Restored the shogun Ashikaga Yoshitane to power after a fifteen-year absence in 1508.
 Ōuchi Yoshitaka (大内義隆, 1507–1551) – The lord who oversaw the height of Ōuchi power and saw it end abruptly.
 Ōuchi Yoshinaga (大内義長, 1532?–1557) – The last Ōuchi lord, he was the son of Sengoku daimyō, Ōtomo Yoshiaki, and thus not of Ōuchi blood.

Notable retainers
 Sue Harukata
 Sue Nagafusa
 Hironaka Takakane
 Iida Okihide

Prominent castles
 Ōuchi-shi Yakata : Ōuchi clan's main bastion
 Kōnomine Castle : Supporting castle of Ōuchi-shi Yakata
 Wakayama Castle : Sue clan's main bastion
 Katsuyama Castle
 Tsuwano Castle
 Tsuchiyama Castle

Notes

References
Sansom, George (1961). A History of Japan: 1334–1615. Stanford: Stanford University Press.
Sansom, George Bailey (1962). Japan: A Short Cultural History. New York: Appleton-Century-Crofts, Inc.
Turnbull, Stephen (1998). The Samurai Sourcebook. London: Cassell & Co.
 

 
Japanese clans